The Battle of Åland Islands, or the Battle of Gotland, which occurred in July 1915, was a naval battle of World War I between the German Empire and the Russian Empire, assisted by a submarine of the British Baltic Flotilla. It took place in the Baltic Sea off the shores of Gotland, Sweden, a country neutral in World War I.

The battle

While sailing through thick fog Rurik and Novik separated from the main group and later acted independently.

After completing his mission, Karpf reported back through the radio. Karpf's message was intercepted and decoded. When Bakhirev became aware of the German squadron's whereabouts, the bombardment of Klaipeda was canceled. The squadron then focused on intercepting the German minelayers with the constant assistance of the naval staff.

Karpf commanded Roon and Lübeck, which at the time were heading towards Liepāja (Libau), to return to Gotland. At the same time he ordered Albatross to find shelter in Swedish territorial waters. Bogatyr and Oleg managed to catch up with Albatross and opened fire. The flaming Albatross ran aground near Östergarn. Bayan, Oleg and Rurik then attempted to return to their base. A couple of hours later they encountered Roon and Lübeck. A short artillery duel followed. A shortage of shells forced the Russian cruisers to retreat. Fearing a possible arrival of enemy reinforcements the damaged German ships also retreated.

As the German armoured cruisers  and  sailed to reinforce the German squadron, Prinz Adalbert was torpedoed by the British submarine  and limped to shore.

Legacy
The battle is regarded as the first instance of Russian signals intelligence.

Notes

References

External links

The History of the Russian Navy: The Great War
Russian Navy on the eve of and during World War I and the Civil War

Action of 19 June 1915
Action of 19 June 1915
Naval battles of World War I involving Russia
Naval battles of World War I involving Germany
Naval battles of World War I involving the United Kingdom
Gotland
July 1915 events